Bergville is an unincorporated community in Ardenhurst Township, Itasca County, Minnesota, United States; located within the Chippewa National Forest.

The community is located between Deer River and Northome at the junction of State Highway 46 (MN 46) and Itasca County Road 31.

Nearby places include Northome, Alvwood, Squaw Lake, and Blackduck.

Bergville is located six miles south of Northome and 41 miles northwest of Deer River. Bergville is also located 13 miles northwest of Squaw Lake and 17 miles northeast of Blackduck.  The boundary line between Itasca and Koochiching counties is nearby.

References

 Rand McNally Road Atlas – 2007 edition – Minnesota entry
 Official State of Minnesota Highway Map – 2011/2012 edition
 Mn/DOT map of Itasca County – Sheet 2 – 2011 edition

Unincorporated communities in Minnesota
Unincorporated communities in Itasca County, Minnesota